Meng Hetang, born in Harbin, China, is a Chinese crosstalk (xiangsheng) comedian and actor. He partners with Zhou Jiuliang on stage and currently leads Performance Team 7 in Deyunshe. He won Xiangsheng Has New Talents (相声有新人) in 2018 and made his film debut with Da Ying Jia in 2020.

Biography 
Meng Hetang was born on April 26, 1988, in Harbin, China. Upon graduation from Heilongjiang Art Vocational College, Meng passed the interview to join Deyunshe in 2008. He officially became an apprentice to Guo Degang on June 13, 2009.

Meng started his stage career in Deyunshe theaters with Performance Team 5 and moved to captain Performance Team 7 in 2017. He held his first personal Xiangsheng Performance in big theatre with Zhou Jiuliang in 2018. From August to October 2018, Meng starred in Xiangsheng Has New Talents, a Xiangsheng talent show airing on national TV, and won first place with Zhou Jiuliang. In 2020, he participated in Happy Comedian Season 6 and won second place. 

Meng starred in Neng Nai Da Le, a Deyunshe-produced TV series in 2018. In 2020, Meng made his film debut with Da Ying Jia, starring as supporting character Zhou You. However, the movie was not released in movie theatres due to the COVID-19 pandemic.

Filmography

Film

Television

Variety Shows

References

External links 

 
 Social Media

Living people
Chinese male stage actors
Chinese xiangsheng performers
Chinese male film actors
1988 births